The Historic Jayhawk State Theatre of Kansas, is a theater located in downtown Topeka, Kansas, United States. The theatre opened on August 16, 1926. 
The Jayhawk Hotel & Crosby Bros shopping complex where attached to the theatre making it a grand complex for visitors to eat, sleep and be entertained.

The Jayhawk Theatre closed in January 1976 and sat vacant until the building complex was purchased in the 1980s. The theatre was donated to a non-profit organization in 1993 after
a demolition denial request was submitted to the Topeka City Council.

Design
The Jayhawk Theatre and arcade was the vision of native Topekan, E.H. Crosby, head of the Crosby Brothers Co. It was designed by architect Thomas W. Williamson of Topeka, KS using work from 
the Boller Brothers of Kansas City. The work was completed in 1926, at a cost of approximately 1 million dollars.
Built of steel and concrete, the auditorium is open, requiring no support posts that might obscure the view. The domed roof had twinkling stars to represent the heavens. 
Featuring three levels, two grand staircases lead from the lobby to the mezzanine floor, where a luxurious lounge was located.
The stage features an ornate proscenium arch with a beautiful mural by William Peaco of Chicago, whose work was featured in many public buildings in the Midwest.
The mural depicts the goddess of agriculture surrounded by state symbols and the Seal of Kansas.

Ownership
The Jayhawk Theatre is owned and operated by a 501(c)(3) non-profit organization called the Historic Jayhawk Theatre Inc. In 1993 the Kansas State Legislature designated the Jayhawk as the official State Theatre of Kansas.

Redevelopment
Historic Jayhawk Theatre Inc. is dedicated to renovation, modernization and preservation of the historic Jayhawk State Theatre of Kansas. The organization is accepting donations, fundraising and hosting events to raise the funds to do so.

The Gallery
The Gallery was added in February 2007 and features artists from Topeka, Kansas. The gallery is located in the future lobby space of the theatre and currently 
operates as an art gallery, event space, small music venue, and gathering location for volunteers who meet weekly.

Notable Acts
New Year's Eve of 1929, Gypsy Rose Lee performed live on-stage at the Jayhawk Theatre.

References

External links
Kansas Historical Society | Jayhawk Theatre Accessed November 27, 2018
Cinema Treasures | Jayhawk Theatre Accessed November 27, 2018
Before burlesque, Gypsy Rose Lee performed at Jayhawk Theatre Accessed June 20, 2019

Movie palaces
Boller Brothers buildings
Event venues on the National Register of Historic Places in Kansas
Commercial buildings on the National Register of Historic Places in Kansas
Theatres on the National Register of Historic Places in Kansas
National Register of Historic Places in Topeka, Kansas
1926 establishments in Kansas
Theatres completed in 1926